The Mt Adams Music Festival is an outdoor music festival held annually in Mount Adams, Cincinnati, Ohio.  Sponsored by the Mt Adams Business Guild the event has been an annual success since 2006.

Venue
Originally located in the parking lot of Towne Properties overlooking Downtown Cincinnati, the event was moved in 2008 to the closed streets of the neighborhood to accommodate the growing crowds.  Born out of the rich arts and entertainment history of Mt. Adams, this event is a showcase of up and coming local, national, and international talent.  The Mt. Adams Music Festival is produced annually by the event's founder, Joe Kendrick and sponsored by the Mt Adams Business/Tavern Guild.  Held on the narrow 19th century neighborhood streets, the event has excellent acoustics and ambiance producing many unique and memorable performances.

Notable Performers 
2011
Alberta Cross, 
Buffalo Killers, 
One Horse

2010
New Medicine, 
Autovaughn, 
Josh Krajcik, 
Buffalo Killers, 
Gran Bel Fisher

2009
Shiny Toy Guns, 
Framing Hanley, 
Josh Krajcik, 
Rusty Bladen, 

2008
Fiction Plane, 
Rusty Bladen, 
LoFi, 
Austin Speigel

2007
Rusty Bladen, 
Gran Bel Fisher, 
Josh Krajcik, 
Kate Voegele, 
Bluf, 
Ricky Nye

2006
Rusty Bladen, 
Griffin House (musician)

References

External links 
Mt Adams Music Festival Facebook
The official site of the Mt Adams Music Festival

2006 establishments in Ohio
Festivals in Cincinnati
Music festivals in Ohio
Recurring events established in 2006
Music of Cincinnati